Ahas Gauwa(One League of Sky) is a 1974 Sri Lankan drama film directed by Dharmasena Pathiraja. It stars Amarasiri Kalansuriya and Swarna Mallawarachchi in lead roles along with Vijaya Kumaratunga, Wimal Kumara de Costa and Cyril Wickramage. Music composed by Premasiri Khemadasa.

Cast
 Amarasiri Kalansuriya as Vijay
 Wimal Kumara de Costa as Gune
 Vijaya Kumaratunga as Mahathun
 Swarna Mallawarachchi as Vijitha
 Wickrama Bogoda as Bandu
 Cyril Wickramage as Cyril
 Somasiri Dehipitiya as Somey
 Pathiraja L. S. Dayananda as Daya
 Nilwathuru Wijewardena as Japana
 Shanthi Lekha as Vijay's Amma
 Gamini Ganegoda as Vijay's Thaththa
 Menik Kurukulasuriya as Vijay's sister
 Daya Thennakoon as Sirisena
 Piyasena Ahangama as Magician
 Alexander Fernando as Japana's leader
 H. S. Premendra as Musician
 Malini Fonseka as Post office co-worker
 Bandula Vithanage as Trip friend
 U. Ariyawimal as Police Inspector
 Chitra Wakishta as Silawathie 'Akka'
 Sanet Dikkumbura as Jeep washer

References

Sri Lanka Cinema Database
 

1974 films
1970s Sinhala-language films